Spicy Love Soup is a 1997 Chinese film directed by Zhang Yang and written by Zhang, Liu Fendou, Cai Shangjun, and Diao Yi'nan based on a story by Zhang and Peter Loehr. Spicy Love Soup was produced by Loehr's Imar Film Company, Xi'an Film Studio, and Taiwanese financing.

The film is Zhang's directorial debut and would prove to be a launching pad for those both in front and behind the cameras. Screenwriters Cai Shangjun (The Red Awn) and Diao Yi'nan (Uniform, Night Train) have since gone on to direct their own films, while Liu Fendou has expanded into both directing (Green Hat) and film production (Zhang Yibai's Spring Subway). The cast is also notable for the debuts of two of China's most popular actresses, Gao Yuanyuan and Xu Jinglei.

The film is an anthology of sorts, and tells its story of love and life in modern Beijing through a series of six vignettes.

Spicy Love Soup was, in addition, the first film in mainland China to see a simultaneous release of a soundtrack, consisting largely of contemporary pop songs.

Cast

First vignette
Wang Xuebing, a husband
Liu Jie, his wife

Second vignette
Tang Sifu, an elderly widow
Li Mei, her daughter
Liu Zhao, a suitor
Li Tang, a suitor
Wen Xingyu, a suitor
Wakin Chau, a neighbor

Third vignette
Zhao Miao, a school boy,
Gao Yuanyuan, his object of affection

Fourth vignette
Guo Tao, a husband
Xu Fan, and his wife

Fifth vignette
Sun Yisheng, a young boy
Pu Cunxin, his father
Lü Liping, his mother

Sixth vignette
Shao Bing, a young man
Xu Jinglei, a young woman

Reception 
Released internationally in London's East West Film Festival in June 1998, Spicy Love Soup was generally well received by western critics. Derek Elley of Variety cited the film as being a pioneering example of the "well directed" Chinese movie, that nevertheless doesn't fall into the camp of "artier" fare.
The film was also well received in mainland China, where it had been released a year earlier, where it became one of the most successful independent films released domestically.

References

External links 

Spicy Love Soup at the Chinese Movie Database

1990s romance films
1997 films
Chinese anthology films
Chinese romance films
Films set in Beijing
1990s Mandarin-language films
Films directed by Zhang Yang
1997 directorial debut films